Kay Purcell (6 December 1963 – 23 December 2020) was an English actress. She was known for her roles as Cynthia Daggert in the ITV soap opera Emmerdale (2001–2002), Candice Smilie in the school-based drama series Waterloo Road (2007–2009), Gina Conway in the CBBC children's drama series Tracy Beaker Returns (2010–2012) and its  spin-off series The Dumping Ground (2013), and Mrs. Rennison in the CBBC sitcom So Awkward (2015–2016).

Career
Purcell's first acting role was as a TV reporter in the TV series Cracker in 1995. She then later starred in Coronation Street as Rhona Summers for 3 episodes in 1997. She appeared as Jenny in the TV series City Central. In 1998 and 2000, she starred in the BBC 1 series Casualty. In 1998 she played WDC McCarthy, and in 2000 played Diane Abley. Later in 2000, she starred in the TV series Children's Ward as Winsome. Her first major role was as Cynthia Daggert in ITV's Emmerdale. She starred in 187 episodes from 2001 to 2002. Her next major role was in Bernard's Watch in 2004–2005, as Ms. Savage for 21 episodes. Purcell played a recurring role in BBC's Waterloo Road as Bolton Smilie's Mum Candice Smilie from 2007–2009. She played the role of Gina Conway in Tracy Beaker Returns for three series, as well as the first series of the spin-off series The Dumping Ground.

Illness and death
In early 2017, Purcell was diagnosed with breast cancer. Purcell posted images, videos and blogs on social media to show her own experience of the disease. In early 2020, Purcell was diagnosed with terminal liver cancer and was given a life expectancy of two years. She died from metastatic breast cancer which had spread to her liver  on 23 December 2020, aged 57.

Filmography

Theatre
The Winter's Tale (1993, as Paulina, Dorcas)
Everybody Knows All Birds Have Wings (1997)
Hormonal Housewives (2012)
Rapunzel (2013, as Gothel the Enchantress)
Sleeping Beauty (2014, as Carabosse)

References

External links
 

1963 births
2020 deaths
English film actresses
English soap opera actresses
English television actresses
Black British actresses
English people of Jamaican descent
Deaths from liver cancer
Deaths from cancer in England
20th-century English actresses
21st-century English actresses
People from Leyland, Lancashire
Actresses from Lancashire